The 1974 Little All-America college football team, also known as the Small College All-America football team, is composed of college football players from small colleges and universities who were selected by the Associated Press (AP) as the best players at each position. For 1974, the AP selected three teams, each team having separate offensive and defensive platoons.

First team

Offense
 Tight end - Mike Barber, Louisiana Tech
 Wide receiver - Jim Myers, Kenyon
 Offensive tackles - Caesar Douglas, Illinois Wesleyan; John Passanti, Western Illinois
 Offensive guards - Herb Scott, Virginia Union; Ray Sweeney, Delaware
 Center - Mark King, Troy State
 Quarterback - Jim McMillan, Boise State
 Running backs - Walter Payton, Jackson State; Everett Talbert, Mike Thomas, Nevada-Las Vegas

Defense
 Defensive ends - Jerry Dahl, North Dakota State; Cleveland Elam, Tennessee State
 Defensive tackles - Fred Dean, Louisiana Tech; Gary Johnson, Grambling
 Middle guard - Glenn Fleming, Northeast Louisiana
 Linebackers - Robert Brazile, Jackson State; Mike McDonald Catawba; Steve Yates, Western Carolina
 Defensive  backs - Greg Grouwinkel, Nevada-Reno; Mark Johnson, Minnesota-Duluth; Virgil Livers, Western Kentucky

Second team

Offense
 Tight end - Fred Coleman, Northeast Louisiana
 Wide receiver - Dwight Duncombe, South Dakota
 Offensive tackles - Brent Adams, Tennessee-Chattanooga; Greg Arnold, Capital
 Offensive guards - Fred Pointer, Southwest Texas State; Da Schmitt, Coe
 Center - John Brooks, Elizabeth City State
 Quarterback - Mike Franckowiak, Central Michigan
 Running backs - Vincent Allen, Indiana State; Don Hardeman, Texas A&I; Jim Van Wagner, Michigan Tech

Defense
 Defensive ends - Lawrence Pillers, Alcorn State; Phil Wells, Cal Davis
 Defensive tackles - John Bushong, Western Kentucky; Joe Ingersoll, Nevada-Las Vegas
 Middle guard - Alan Klein,, Southeastern Louisiana
 Linebackers - Jerry Janik, Texas A&I; Art Thomas, Wittenberg; Pete Yorkoski, Santa Clara
 Defensive backs -  Ralph Gebhardt, Rochester; Tony Parisi, Wagner; Ed Pinkham, Allegheny

Third team

Offense
 Tight end - Duane Spale, Midand
 Wide receiver - Ron Gustafson, North Dakota
 Offensive tackles - James Files, McNeese State; Larry McFarland, Texas A&I
 Offensive guards - Coy Gibson, Wofford; Allen Haigler, Tennessee State
 Center - Bob McAndrews, North Park
 Quarterback - Lynn Hieber, Indiana (PA)
 Running backs - Tim Barrett, John Carroll; Nate Beasley, Delaware; Charles McDaniel, Louisiana Tech

Defense
 Defensive ends - Elois Grooms, Tennessee Tech; Sam Miller, Delaware
 Defensive tackles - Bill Chandler, Northwood Inst.; Dave Nygaard, Linfield
 Middle guard - Bennie Barbour, Winston Salem State
 Linebackers - Nick Buehler, UC Riverside; Tom Kozlosky, East Stroudsburg; Ron Rosenberg, Montana
 Defensive ends - Anthony Leonard, Virginia Union; Granville Lyons, Tennessee State; Glen Printers, Southern Colorado

See also
 1974 College Football All-America Team

References

Little All-America college football team
Little All-America college football team
Little All-America college football team
Little All-America college football teams